Pomphorhynchus laevis is an endo-parasitic acanthocephalan worm, with a complex life cycle, that can modify the behaviour of its intermediate host, the freshwater amphipod Gammarus pulex. P. laevis does not contain a digestive tract and relies on the nutrients provided by its host species. In the fish host this can lead to the accumulation of lead in P. laevis by feeding on the bile of the host species.

Life cycle and host species

Pomphorhynchus laevis is a parasite with a complex life cycle, meaning that it needs multiple host species to complete it. The female releases eggs containing acanthor that are then ingested by an arthropod. The acanthor is then released from the egg and becomes acanthella which penetrate the host's gut wall and transforms into the infective cystacanth stage which presents as a cyst. The larval stages (cystacanths) reside in the hemocoel of its intermediate host, gammarids. From them it is trophically transmitted to fish. Several fish species can serve as the definitive host, where P. laevis infect the intestine. In the fish host, bile is an important resource for the growth of P. laevis. The preferred final hosts of Pomphorhynchus laevis include the chub, Leuciscus cephalus and barbel, Barbus barbus when in freshwater and the minnow, Phoxinus phoxinus when in an isolated body of water.

Host species
In the wild, Pomphorhynchus laevis is known to infect a range of fish species from several families as definitive hosts. These include barbel, gudgeon, chub, roach, vairone, nase, rudd, common dace, minnow, loach, catfish, perch, bullhead,  three-spined stickleback, and brown trout

Location of infection
Infection in the fish host is in the posterior part of the middle intestine, more specifically behind the pyloric caeca.  Immature P. laevis are mainly found in the proximal part of the digestive tract while mature and developing P. laevis are found near the first intestinal loop with the posterior third loop of the digestive tract being uninhabitable.

Ecology

In the fish host a positive association between fish biomass density and P. laevis abundance is seen. This suggests that the parasites accumulates in the fish hosts with age and that there is limited impact of intra-host density on parasite settlement.

In the River Ouche at Dijon natural infection levels of gammarids can be as low as 3.5% and co-infections with other acantocephalan species are rare.

Environmental impacts on ecology

Heavy metals
Like other acanthocephalan species, Pomphorhynchus laevis can show high levels of heavy metal accumulation when infecting the definitive host. This means that it has potential to be used as a sensitive indicator of pollution. For example, arsenic, cadmium, copper, lead, and zinc have all been detected in P. laevis in higher concentrations compared to those found in its barber host.

Accumulation of heavy metals follows seasonal patterns which are most likely explained by seasonal parasite transmission. Highest concentrations are seen in autumn, when parasite infrapopulations consist largely of young individuals.

When chub (Squalius cephalus, a definitive host of P. laevis) infected with P. laevis are exposed to different concentrations of lead, the parasite is able to reduce lead concentrations in the host. The normal mechanism of filtering lead for a freshwater fish includes the binding of the lead to steroids contained in the bile of the liver. The bile then travels down the bile duct into the small intestine where the lead is either absorbed or excreted. The parasite reduces the lead concentration in the bile of the chub once it has travelled to the small intestine by absorbing the metals contained in the bile. The lead being absorbed by P. laevis leaves less lead in the bile to be reabsorbed by the chub. This results in decreased levels of lead in the bile of the fish as well as in the fish organs. P. laevis itself builds up high concentrations of lead (1000 times water concentration).

Temperature
The infection success of acanthors emerging from eggs to Gammarus pulex is not affected by temperature, but developmental rate is increased at warmer temperatures (14 versus 17 °C). At the same temperatures parasite infection reduces survival of these hosts, but this is not compounded by temperature.

Host manipulation

Intermediate host
Pomphorhynchus laevis facilitates its transmission from the intermediate to the definitive host by altering the behaviour and visual appearance of its gammarid intermediate hosts.

Manipulation of appearance 
At the same time, the parasites itself develops a bright orange colour making it more visible and consequently more likely to be consumed by a fish host. This visual manipulation is effective specifically on host species that can serve as suitable hosts as fish species that are not suitable hosts are less attracted.

Manipulation of behaviour 
Infected gammarids are made to develop a preference for fish odours  and responses to light.

Pomphorhynchus laevis can change the response of Gammarus pulex to light (phototaxis). Uninfected, healthy individuals of G. pulex show strong photophobic behaviour, meaning they avoid light. This helps to avoid predation. When infected with P. laevis, G. pulex become strongly photophilic and seek out light. The increases the chance of predation, in turn increasing the likelihood of parasite transmission. This alteration in behaviour in response to light was found to involve an alteration in serotonergic activity of the brain. The immunoreactivity of the brain to serotonin was found to be increased by around 40 percent for infected G. pulex when compared to uninfected counterparts.

It is also shown that G. pulex infected with the infective larval stage (cystacanths) of P. laevis, are less likely to show behaviours that would normally allow them to avoid predation. These behaviours include using refuge less frequently, being less likely to cluster together when in the presence of danger, and frequently clinging to things floating in the water. When G. pulex are infected by the non-infective life stage of P. laevis, there is an increased use of refuge which in turn decreases the risk of predation which is advantageous to the parasite due to them not being able to infect the next host when in this life stage.

Manipulation of feeding and metabolism 
In the same host food presence does not appear to affect time and intensity of infection, while low food availability does negatively affect host growth. Possibly due to reduced metabolic rate of the host.

Manipulation of immune response 
After invading the host P. laevis needs to deal with their host's immune system. Levels of phenoloxidase and total immune activity were significantly reduced in infected G. pulex compared to controls. This led to a positive effect on bacterial growth in the host, which may a negative affect gammarid health and consequently infecting P. laevis.

Definitive hosts
P. laevis excretes several neurochemical in the gut of the fish hosts, it thus appears likely that the parasites alters the physiological functioning of its host's alimentary tract .

Biomimetics

This worm swells its proboscis to press microneedles into the intestinal wall, with a very strong adhesive force.  This has inspired a structural skin graft adhesive that sticks strongly but has minimal tissue damage while in place and upon removal.

References

Echinorhynchida
Suicide-inducing parasitism
Animals described in 1776
Taxa named by Otto Friedrich Müller